The 2017–18 Ligue Nationale du football Amateur is the eighth season of the league under its current title and eighth season under its current league division format. A total of 48 teams will be contesting the league. The league is scheduled to start on September 15, 2017. RC Boumerdes, despite falling last season, but by the Federal Office at its meeting on 23 August 2017 decided to keep them in the Ligue Nationale du Football Amateur.

Stadiums and locations

League table

Groupe Est

Groupe Centre

Groupe Ouest

References

External links
 Ligue Nationale de Football Amateur
 Algerian Football Federation

Ligue Nationale du Football Amateur seasons
3
Algeria